Zhao Xiaolei (born August 3, 1966 in Heilongjiang) is a Chinese ice dancer. He competed at two Winter Olympic Games with two different partners. With partner Liu Luyang, he is the 1986 Asian Winter Games champion. Liu & Zhao placed 19th at the 1988 Winter Olympics. With partner Xi Hongyan, he placed 19th at the 1984 Winter Olympics. He was 19 at the time.

Results
(with Liu)

References

 Skatabase: 1980s Olympics Results

Chinese male ice dancers
Olympic figure skaters of China
Figure skaters at the 1988 Winter Olympics
Figure skaters at the 1984 Winter Olympics
Asian Games medalists in figure skating
Figure skaters at the 1986 Asian Winter Games
Living people
1966 births
Medalists at the 1986 Asian Winter Games
Asian Games gold medalists for China
Figure skaters from Heilongjiang